Ready is an unincorporated community in Grayson County, Kentucky.

History
A post office called Ready was established in 1884, and remained in operation until 1974. The origin of the name "Ready" is obscure.

References

Unincorporated communities in Grayson County, Kentucky
Unincorporated communities in Kentucky